Toea Wisil (1 January 1988) is an athlete from Papua New Guinea who specializes in sprints. She was selected as her nation's flag bearer at the 2012 Summer Olympics Parade of Nations.  In her race, she impressed American TV announcer Ato Bolden by running an eased up 11.60 into a strong headwind, the number one qualifier from the preliminary round of the 100 m.  She was equally impressive in the quarterfinal, beating the field including Allyson Felix out of the blocks and coming within .05 of qualifying to the semi-final round, finishing ahead of athletes that did not need to run in the preliminary round.
During the Pacific Games, she won a triple-triple individual gold, 100 m, 200 m and 400 m, during 3 different editions, 2011, 2015 and 2019.

Personal bests
100 m: 11.29 s NR (wind: +1.9 m/s) –  Suva, 9 July 2016
200 m: 23.13 s NR (wind: +1.5 m/s) –  Canberra, 12 March 2017
400 m: 53.19 s NR –  Gold Coast, 14 August 2010

Achievements

References

External links

Sports reference biography

Papua New Guinean female sprinters
Olympic athletes of Papua New Guinea
1988 births
Athletes (track and field) at the 2012 Summer Olympics
Athletes (track and field) at the 2016 Summer Olympics
Living people
People from the Western Highlands Province
Athletes (track and field) at the 2006 Commonwealth Games
Athletes (track and field) at the 2010 Commonwealth Games
Athletes (track and field) at the 2014 Commonwealth Games
Commonwealth Games competitors for Papua New Guinea
Oceanian Athletics Championships winners
Olympic female sprinters
Athletes (track and field) at the 2022 Commonwealth Games